John A. Brennan Jr. (born September 19, 1945) is an American lobbyist and former legislator who served in the Massachusetts House of Representatives from 1973 to 1974 and the Massachusetts Senate from 1974 to 1990. He is a Democrat from Malden.

See also
 Massachusetts Senate's 3rd Middlesex district

References

1945 births
Living people
American lobbyists
Democratic Party members of the Massachusetts House of Representatives
Democratic Party Massachusetts state senators
Politicians from Malden, Massachusetts